The House Democratic Caucus is a congressional caucus composed of all Democratic representatives in the United States House of Representatives, voting and non-voting, and is responsible for nominating and electing the Democratic Party leadership in the chamber. In its roles as a party conference, the caucus writes and enforces rules of conduct and discipline for its members, approves committee assignments, and serves as the primary forum for development of party policy and legislative priorities. It hosts weekly meetings for these purposes and to communicate the party's message to members.

The caucus has a Caucus Chairman and Caucus Vice-Chair (formerly called the Secretary). For the 118th Congress, Hakeem Jeffries was elected as the Minority Leader, Katherine Clark became the Minority Whip and Pete Aguilar was chosen as the Caucus Chairman.

Current hierarchy
Effective with the start of the 118th Congress, the chain of command conference leadership is as follows (from highest to lowest):

Hakeem Jeffries (NY) as House Minority Leader (Caucus Leader)
Katherine Clark (MA) as House Minority Whip 
Pete Aguilar (CA) as Caucus Chairman
Ted Lieu (CA) as Caucus Vice Chair

Leadership history
The House Democratic Caucus, through its institutional antecedent, the Democratic-Republican caucus, was established on April 2, 1796, to stop a treaty with Great Britain which unfairly treated American sailors. For many years, through 1820, it nominated presidential candidates (before the era of national nominating conventions).

Since 2023, the House Democratic Leader has been Rep. Hakeem Jeffries of New York  (the first African-American congressional party leader in U.S. history). He was elected to succeed longtime Democratic leader and the first woman Speaker of the House in U.S. history Nancy Pelosi. 

At the Organizational Meeting on November 18, 2008, of the Democratic Caucus for the 111th Congress, Representative John B. Larson (D-Connecticut) was elected Caucus Chairman by acclamation. The election was presided over by the outgoing chairman of the Democratic Caucus for the 110th Congress, former Representative Rahm Emanuel (D-Illinois). Rep. Larson officially assumed the position of chairman on the first day of the 111th Congress, January 3, 2009.

After his election as chairman at the Organizational Meeting on November 18, Chairman Larson presided over the election of Rep. Xavier Becerra (D-California), who defeated Representative Marcy Kaptur of Ohio by a vote count of 175 to 67. Rep. Becerra likewise assumed his vice-chairmanship on January 3.

Leaders of the House Democratic Caucus

Notes

List of chairs
Chairs are currently limited to two consecutive terms.

List of vice-chairs
The vice-chair of the Democratic Caucus ranks just below the Chair of the House Democratic Caucus. In addition to other duties, the vice-chair has a seat on the Steering and Policy Committee.

Mary Rose Oakar (1987–1989)
Steny Hoyer (1989)
Vic Fazio (1989–1995)
Barbara B. Kennelly (1995–1999) 
Bob Menendez (1999–2003)
Jim Clyburn (2003–2006)
John B. Larson (2006–2009)
Xavier Becerra (2009–2012)
Joe Crowley (2012–2017)
Linda Sánchez (2017–2019)
Katherine Clark (2019–2021)
Pete Aguilar (2021–2023)
Ted Lieu (2023–present)</onlyinclude>

List of secretaries
The office of Secretary of the Democratic Caucus preceded the office of vice-chair. Until its elimination in 1987, the office of Secretary was reserved for a female member of the House.

 Chase G. Woodhouse (1949–1951)
 Edna F. Kelly (1953–1957, 1964)
 Leonor K. Sullivan (1959–1975, except 1964)
 Patsy Mink (1975–1977)
 Shirley Chisholm (1977–1981)
 Geraldine Ferraro (1981–1985)
 Mary Rose Oakar (1985–1987)

See also
 Republican Conference of the United States House of Representatives
 Congressional caucus

References

External links
 Official site of the Democratic Caucus

Caucuses of the United States Congress
Caucus of the United States House of Representatives
Leaders of the United States House of Representatives